Orlestone is a mid-sized civil parish in Ashford District, Kent, England, with a population of 1,407. The centre of the parish is Hamstreet village which falls almost entirely within it but has a small fraction in the parish of Warehorne.  The civil parish here reflects the very longstanding dominance of Orlestreet as its ecclesiastical parish boundary and provides a third alternative to most residents of Hamstreet to their village name, other than 'Ham Street'. Hamstreet is bypassed by the A2070 road, six miles south of Ashford.

Description
Most of the population live in a cross-civil parish settlement at the middle and edge of Orlestone, which is Hamstreet.

Orlestone itself is a small hamlet with a typical short street number of houses and the medieval parish church of St Mary the Virgin, parts of which date to the 11th century. Much of the population moved to Hamstreet (originally known as Ham) when the Ashford to Hastings railway opened in 1853; there was also a better source of water at the newer place.

Eponymous places in the civil parish are Orlestone Forest, and buildings such as Orlestone Grange and Orlestone Riding Centre (near Shadoxhurst). Also a neighbourhood of Hamstreet built in 2006 has been named Orlestone View.

As with Warehorne the north of the area is forested.

Transport
Ham Street railway station is central to Hamstreet and is also in approximately the midpoint of this parish.

References

External links

 Parish Council website
 Statistical civil parish overview - map

Borough of Ashford
Civil parishes in Ashford, Kent